The Romania national under-20 rugby union team is Romania's junior national team in rugby union. They have represented Romania in the IRB Junior World Rugby Trophy, now known as the World Rugby Under 20 Trophy but have not yet participate in the World Rugby Under 20 Championship. They participated in the first three Junior World Trophies, winning it in 2009, and in 2018 they will be the hosts of the World Rugby Under 20 Trophy for the first time.

Results in the World Rugby Under 20 Trophy

2008 IRB Junior World Rugby Trophy
Pool
  28–26 
  46–7 
  14–3 
3rd place play-off
  10–34

2009 IRB Junior World Rugby Trophy
Pool
  17–50 
  14–65 
  26–20 
Final
  13–25

2010 IRB Junior World Rugby Trophy
Pool
  12–15   
  30–7  
  48–12 
3rd place play-off
  20–23 (aet)

2018 World Rugby Under 20 Trophy
Pool
  55 - 26 
  31 - 17 
  33 – 56 
7th place play-off
  14 – 71

Players

Current squad
On the 5th of November 2021, the following 26 players were called up for the 2021 Rugby Europe Under 20s Championship.

Head Coach:  Marius Tincu

Coaches

Current coaching staff
The current coaching staff of the Romanian national team:

See also
 Rugby union in Romania
 Romania national rugby union team
 Romania national rugby sevens team
 Romania women's national rugby sevens team

References

External links
 Official website 

Rugby union in Romania
European national under-20 rugby union teams
Romania